Alfred L. Rinesch (born May 14, 1911, in Vienna, Austria - died January 1, 2005, in Pörtschach am Wörthersee, Austria) was an Austrian architect.

He was married to Maria Magdalena Franziska, Gräfin Hoyos Freiin zu Stichsenstein. Their wedding day was December 28, 1938.
In 1948 he won a silver medal in the art competitions of the Olympic Games for his "Wassersportzentrum in Kärnten" ("Water Sports Centre in Carinthia").

Works 
 Architectural design for the Lutheran Redeemer church, 1956–1959, in Poertschach am Woerthersee, Carinthia, Austria

References

External links 
 Alfred Rinesch's profile at databaseOlympics
 Alfred Rinesch's profile at Sports Reference.com

1911 births
2005 deaths
Austrian architects
Olympic silver medalists in art competitions
Medalists at the 1948 Summer Olympics
Olympic competitors in art competitions